The Diocese of Matlosane (formerly the Diocese of Klerksdorp) is a diocese of the Anglican Church of Southern Africa. The diocese was founded in 1990, divided from the Anglican Diocese of Johannesburg. It occupies the central part of the North West province in South Africa.

List of bishops
 1990–2006: David Nkwe
 2007–present: Molopi Diseko

Coat of arms 
The diocese registered arms at the Bureau of Heraldry in 1989 : Vert, a chevron rompu Or and in base an Agnus Dei proper; the shield ensigned of an episcopal  mitre, also proper.

References

External links
 

1990 establishments in South Africa
Anglican Church of Southern Africa dioceses
 
North West (South African province)